This is the discography of Turkish pop singer Bengü, who has released eight studio albums, six maxi singles and numerous singles. She is one of the best-selling female artists in Turkey.

Albums

Studio albums

Remix albums

Singles

As lead artist

As featured artist

Charts

Music videos

References

External links
 
 Bengü discography at Discogs

Discographies of Turkish artists
Pop music discographies